Nathaniel T. Helman (February 10, 1905 – October 31, 1993) was an American lawyer and politician from New York.

Life
He was born on February 10, 1905, in New York City. He married Minnie (1910–2004), and they had two sons.

Helman was a member of the New York State Senate from 1950 to 1960, sitting in the 167th, 168th, 169th, 170th, 171st and 172nd New York State Legislatures. He was a delegate to the 1956 Democratic National Convention, and an alternate delegate to the 1960 Democratic National Convention. In November 1960, he was elected to the City Court.

He was a justice of the City Court in 1961. He resigned on September 19, and in November 1961 was elected to the New York Supreme Court. He was a justice of the Supreme Court from 1962 to 1981.

He died on October 31, 1993, in Lenox Hill Hospital in Manhattan, of cancer.

References

1905 births
1993 deaths
Democratic Party New York (state) state senators
New York Supreme Court Justices
People from the Bronx
20th-century American judges
20th-century American politicians